The RD-170 is the world's most powerful and heaviest liquid-fuel rocket engine. It was designed and produced in the Soviet Union by NPO Energomash for use with the Energia launch vehicle.

Shared turbopump 
Several Soviet and Russian rocket engines use the approach of clustering small combustion chambers around a single turbine and pump. During the early 1950s, many Soviet engine designers, including Valentin P. Glushko, faced problems of combustion instability while designing bigger thrust chambers. At that time, they solved the problem by using a cluster of smaller thrust chambers.

Variants

RD-170
The RD-170 engine featured four combustion chambers and was developed for use on the Energia launch vehicle – both the engine and the launch vehicle were in production only for a short time. Energia was launched twice. Each Energia vehicle had a core hydrolox stage, plus 4 Zenit boosters, each powered by one RD-170.

The engine was designed for 10 reuses but tests showed they could stand up to 20 burns.

RD-171

Building on the technology from the Energia's liquid fuel booster the Zenit (rocket family) was developed, which uses a RD-170 variant, the RD-171. While the RD-170 had nozzles which swiveled on two axes, the RD-171's nozzles only swivel on one axis. RD-171 was intended to be used on Zenit rocket. Models called the RD-172 and RD-173 were proposed, upgrades that would provide additional thrust, and the RD-173 proposal was finalized as the RD-171M upgrade in 2006.

RD-171MV
A modification of RD-171M being developed for the Irtysh rocket. Unlike RD-171M it's completely made from Russian components and features a new control system. First test sample was manufactured in early 2019
Tests were reported to have been successfully completed in September 2021.

Dual-chamber derivative

The RD-180 uses only two combustion chambers instead of the four of the RD-170. The RD-180 used on the Atlas V replaced the three engines used on early Atlas rockets with a single engine and achieved significant payload and performance gains. This engine had also been chosen to be the main propulsion system for the first stage of the now cancelled Russian Rus-M rocket.

Single-chamber derivative

The RD-191 is a single-chamber version used in the Russian Angara rocket. Variants of RD-191 include RD-151 in South Korean Naro-1 rocket, RD-181 in American Orbital ATK Antares rocket, and the proposed RD-193 for the Soyuz-2-1v project.

Proposed variants

On 28 July 2011, NPO Energomash summarised the results of the work on Rus-M rocket engine and considered the possibility of construction several new variants of RD-170 family engines. According to the information, new and proposed variants will be marked as:
 RD-180M for crewed Atlas V rocket (Not required, current RD-180 meets crewed Atlas V requirements.)
 RD-180V for Rus-M rocket.
 RD-175 with 9800 kN thrust for proposed Energia-K rocket.

In 2017, Director General of RKK Energia Vladimir Solntsev referred to a "simplified" and "cheaper" version of the RD-171 engine in connection with the Soyuz-5 (Sunkar) project.

Specifications 
 4 combustion chambers, 4 nozzles
 1 set of turbines and pumps; turbine produces approximately 257,000 hp (192MW); equivalent to the power output of 3 nuclear-powered icebreakers
 Ignition: pyrophoric start-up fuel capsule (triethylaluminium)
 Vacuum thrust: 
 Vacuum Isp: 
 Sea-level Isp: 
 Weight: 
 Thrust-to-weight ratio: 82

See also 
 Comparison of orbital rocket engines

References

External links 
Manufacturer's Page (Archived)
RD-170/171 specifications and design (in Russian)
External image
Astronautix.com entry on RD-170

Rocket engines of the Soviet Union
Rocket engines of Russia
Rocket engines using kerosene propellant
Soviet inventions
Rocket engines using the staged combustion cycle
Energomash rocket engines